Hanna Ballin Lewis is the editor and English language translator of two of German writer Fanny Lewald's most popular books, Erinnerungen aus dem Jahre 1848, published as "Recollections of 1848", and an abridged version of Lewald's autobiography Meine Lebensgeschichte, titled The Education of Fanny Lewald: An Autobiography". She has published extensively on Lewald, Hugo von Hofmannsthal and many other modern German and Austrian writers.

Hanna was born in Berlin, Germany, in 1931. In October 1938, two weeks before the Kristallnacht pogrom, she immigrated with her parents to Philadelphia, USA, to flee Nazi persecution of Jews. Hanna is a retired Professor of German at Sam Houston State University. She earned her undergraduate, Master's and PhD degrees from Rice University in Houston, Texas, USA, where she presently resides, with her  husband of more than 60 years, Dr. Bernard M. Lewis.

References

External links 
 Hanna Ballin Lewis at amazon.com

German–English translators
Sam Houston State University faculty
German emigrants to the United States
Living people
1931 births
Rice University alumni
Linguists from the United States